This is an audio and video discography of the Vienna Philharmonic orchestra. Founded in 1842, the orchestra has a long history of recording music dating back to 1905.

Audio recordings

 Beethoven : Complete Piano Concertos (this cycle was recorded with Vladimir Ashkenazy, Alfred Brendel, Maurizio Pollini and Krystian Zimerman).
 Beethoven : Symphony No. 3 conducted by Felix Weingartner, also conducted by Erich Kleiber
 Beethoven, Symphony No. 5, Symphony No. 7 conducted by Carlos Kleiber
 Beethoven : Complete Symphonies conducted by Karl Böhm; this cycle was also recorded with Leonard Bernstein, Hans Schmidt-Isserstedt, Claudio Abbado, Simon Rattle and Christian Thielemann
 Berg : the Wozzeck and Lulu operas, conducted by Christoph von Dohnányi 
 Berlioz : Symphonie fantastique, conducted by Sir Colin Davis, also conducted by Valery Gergiev and Bernard Haitink
 Bernstein : Candide, conducted by Zubin Mehta
 Borodin : Symphony No. 2 conducted by Rafael Kubelík
 Brahms : Symphony No. 2 conducted by Wilhelm Furtwängler
 Brahms : Symphony No. 4 conducted by Carlos Kleiber
 Brahms : Complete Symphonies conducted by Karl Böhm; this cycle was also recorded with John Barbirolli, István Kertész, James Levine, Carlo Maria Giulini and Leonard Bernstein
 Brahms : Ein Deutsches Requiem conducted by Herbert von Karajan, also recorded by Carlo Maria Giulini, Otto Klemperer, Bernard Haitink and Nikolaus Harnoncourt
 Brahms : Complete Concertos, with Krystian Zimerman, piano, Gidon Kremer, violin and Mischa Maisky, cello, conducted by Leonard Bernstein. The Orchestra has also recorded the Brahms piano concertos with Maurizio Pollini, with Karl Böhm conducting in No. 1 and Claudio Abbado conducting in No. 2
 Bruckner :  Symphony No. 4 conducted by Karl Böhm
 Bruckner :  Symphony No. 7 and 8 conducted by Karl Böhm, Herbert von Karajan and Georg Solti
 Bruckner : Symphonies Nos. 7, 8 and 9 conducted by Carlo Maria Giulini
 Bruckner : Symphonies Nos. 8 and 9 conducted by Carl Schuricht
 Bruckner : Symphonies Nos. 3, 4, 5, 8 and Te Deum conducted by Bernard Haitink
 Bruckner : Symphonies Nos. 5 and 9 conducted by Nikolaus Harnoncourt
 Bruckner : Symphony No. 8 conducted by Pierre Boulez
 Dvořák : Symphonies Nos. 7, 8 and 9, conducted by Lorin Maazel, recordings of nos. 8 & 9 were also made under Herbert von Karajan and Seiji Ozawa. The Orchestra has also recorded Nos. 7 & 9 with Rafael Kubelík
 Dvořák : Symphony No. 9 conducted by Kirill Kondrashin
 Dvořák : Symphonies Nos. 6 and 8, conducted by Myung-whun Chung
 Elgar : Enigma Variations conducted by Sir Georg Solti, also conducted by Sir John Eliot Gardiner
 Glass : Violin Concerto No. 1 with Gidon Kremer, violin, conducted by Christoph von Dohnányi
 Holst : The Planets, conducted by Herbert von Karajan
 Khachaturian : excerpts from Spartacus and Gayane conducted by Aram Khachaturian
 Mahler : The Song of the Earth (Das Lied von der Erde) with Kathleen Ferrier (contralto), conducted by Bruno Walter, also conducted by Leonard Bernstein with James King and Dietrich Fischer-Dieskau, Pierre Boulez with Michael Schade and Violeta Urmana, and Carlo Maria Giulini with Francisco Araiza and Brigitte Fassbaender
 Mahler : Complete Symphonies (1–9 plus the Adagio of Symphony No. 10) conducted by Lorin Maazel and Leonard Bernstein (on DVD, except Symphony No. 2)
 Mahler : Symphony No. 2 conducted by Pierre Boulez, also recorded with Claudio Abbado, Zubin Mehta, James Levine and Gilbert Kaplan
 Mahler : Symphony No. 3 conducted by Pierre Boulez, also recorded with Claudio Abbado and Bernard Haitink
 Mahler : Symphony No. 5 conducted by Pierre Boulez, also recorded with Leonard Bernstein
 Mahler : Symphony No. 6 conducted by Pierre Boulez, also recorded with Leonard Bernstein
 Mahler : Symphony No. 9 conducted by Claudio Abbado, also recorded with Simon Rattle
 Mendelssohn : Complete Symphonies conducted by Christoph von Dohnányi
 Mendelssohn : Symphony No. 5 and another works conducted by Franz Welser-Möst and Fabio Luisi
 Mozart : Symphonies Nos. 35, 39, 40 conducted by István Kertész
 Mozart : Symphonies Nos. 38, 39, 40, 41 conducted by Karl Böhm, also recorded with Leonard Bernstein and James Levine
 Mozart : Die Entführung aus dem Serail, conducted by Josef Krips (two recordings), also recorded with Georg Solti
 Mozart : The Marriage of Figaro conducted by Erich Kleiber, also recorded with Herbert von Karajan (two recordings), Erich Leinsdorf, Claudio Abbado and Riccardo Muti
 Mozart : Don Giovanni conducted by Josef Krips, also recorded with Erich Leinsdorf and Riccardo Muti
 Mozart : Così fan tutte conducted by Karl Böhm, also recorded with James Levine
 Mozart : Die Zauberflöte, conducted by Sir Georg Solti (two recordings); the orchestra has also recorded the opera under Karl Böhm, Herbert von Karajan and James Levine
 Mozart : Requiem conducted by Herbert von Karajan, also recorded with István Kertész, Karl Böhm and Georg Solti
 Mussorgsky : Pictures at an Exhibition (arr. Ravel), conducted by Valery Gergiev, also recorded with André Previn
 Orff : Carmina Burana, conducted by André Previn
 Prokofiev : Peter and the Wolf, with Hermione Gingold, conducted by Karl Böhm
 Rimsky-Korsakov : Scheherazade, conducted by Seiji Ozawa, also conducted by André Previn
 Arnold Schoenberg : Erwartung, Op.17, conducted by Christoph von Dohnányi 
 Schoenberg : Gurre-Lieder, conducted by Claudio Abbado 
 Schubert : Symphony No. 8 conducted by Carl Schuricht
 Schubert: Symphony No. 9 conducted by Josef Krips, also conducted by Sir Georg Solti and John Eliot Gardiner
 Schubert : Complete Symphonies conducted by István Kertész
 Schumann : Complete Symphonies, Cello & Piano Concertos conducted by Leonard Bernstein with Mischa Maisky and Justus Frantz
 Sibelius : Complete Symphonies conducted by Lorin Maazel
 Sibelius : Symphonies Nos. 1, 2, 5 and 7, conducted by Leonard Bernstein
 Smetana : Má vlast conducted by James Levine, also conducted by Rafael Kubelík
 Johann Strauss II and Strauss family, works recorded at the traditional New Year's Day concert conducted by Herbert von Karajan, Claudio Abbado, Carlos Kleiber, Nikolaus Harnoncourt, Riccardo Muti etc. (See also: The New Year Concert of the Vienna Philharmonic Orchestra)
 Richard Strauss : Eine Alpensinfonie, conducted by Seiji Ozawa, also conducted by Hans Knappertsbusch, André Previn and Christian Thielemann
 Richard Strauss : Also sprach Zarathustra, conducted by Herbert von Karajan, also conducted by Lorin Maazel and André Previn
 Richard Strauss : Ein Heldenleben, conducted by Clemens Krauss, also conducted by Georg Solti, Christian Thielemann, André Previn and Karl Böhm
 Richard Strauss : Der Rosenkavalier, conducted by Erich Kleiber, also conducted by George Szell, Clemens Krauss, Hans Knappertsbusch, Robert Heger, Leonard Bernstein, Sir Georg Solti, Christoph von Dohnányi, Herbert von Karajan, Semyon Bychkov    
 Igor Stravinsky : The Firebird, conducted by Christoph von Dohnányi
 Igor Stravinsky : Petrushka, conducted by Christoph von Dohnányi, also recorded with Lorin Maazel
 Igor Stravinsky : Le Sacre du printemps, conducted by Zubin Mehta, also recorded with Lorin Maazel
 Tchaikovsky : Ballet Suites conducted by James Levine, also recorded with Herbert von Karajan
 Tchaikovsky: Symphonies Nos. 4–6 conducted by Valery Gergiev, also recorded with Rafael Kubelík, Lorin Maazel and Herbert von Karajan
 Verdi : Requiem conducted by Georg Solti, also recorded with Nikolaus Harnoncourt, Herbert von Karajan, Claudio Abbado and Fritz Reiner
 Wagner : Die Walküre, first act, conducted by Bruno Walter
 Wagner : Die Walküre (complete), conducted by Wilhelm Furtwängler
 Wagner : Der Ring des Nibelungen, conducted by Georg Solti, voted by Gramophone as the century's finest classical record.
 Williams : arrangements of music from "Star Wars", "Raiders of the Lost Ark", "Close Encounters of the Third Kind", and other film scores, including arrangements for violin and orchestra, with Anne-Sophie Mutter performing as the soloist. Conducted by Williams.

References
Sources
Complete Stereophonic Discography on Wiener Philharmoniker, accessed 15 May 2013

Further reading
Hunt, John (2000), Wiener Philharmoniker 1 – Vienna Philharmonic and Vienna State Opera Orchestras. Discography Part 1 1905–1954, University of California
Hunt, John (2000), Wiener Philharmoniker 2 – Vienna Philharmonic and Vienna State Opera Orchestras. Discography Part 2 1954–1989, University of California

Orchestra discographies
Vienna Philharmonic